Francis Michael Arroyo Magalona Jr., better known as simply Frank Magalona is a Filipino actor and rapper.

Biography
He was born December 19, 1987 in Manila, Philippines. He is the son of the late rapper Francis Magalona and Pia Arroyo-Magalona. He is also the grandson of Pancho Magalona and Tita Duran. He has four sisters: Unna Lu, Maxene Magalona, Saab Magalona and Clara Magalona. He also has three brothers: Nicolo Magalona, Elmo Magalona, and Arkin Magalona. He is a cousin of Hiro Peralta.

Filmography

Television

Album

References

External links
 Frank Magalona at iGMA.tv

1987 births
Filipino male television actors
Living people
Frank
People from Manila
21st-century Filipino male singers

GMA Network personalities